Fotlandsvåg is a village in Osterøy municipality in Vestland county, Norway. The village is located on the northern shore of the island of Osterøy, along the Osterfjorden.

The main industries in the village are furniture manufacturing and fish farming as well as a hotel "Fjordslottet".

References

Villages in Vestland
Osterøy